Boyd Lake State Park is a state park in the U.S. state of Colorado, located north of Loveland, Colorado. It became a state recreation area under the Colorado Division of Game, Fish, and Parks in 1965. The park sometimes holds events for the public including fishing derbies and clinics, education programs, and volunteer projects. Activities permitted within the park include boating, fishing, picnicking, swimming, hiking, biking, and hunting.

See also
List of largest reservoirs of Colorado

References

State parks of Colorado
Protected areas of Larimer County, Colorado
Protected areas established in 1965
Reservoirs in Colorado
1965 establishments in Colorado